"Kiss and Tell" is a song by Bryan Ferry, the lead vocalist for Roxy Music. It was released as the second single from his seventh studio album Bête Noire in February 1988, being Ferry's twenty-sixth single. The song peaked at number 41 on the UK Singles Chart and at number 31 on the US Billboard 100. It also appears in the film Bright Lights, Big City (1988), adapted from the Jay McInerney novel.

Composition
Fans have often speculated that his song "Kiss and Tell", was Ferry's response to Jerry Hall's tell-all book about their relationship published a couple of years earlier.

Music video

The song's main promotional video featured Mandy Smith and model Denice Lewis, whose photograph also adorns the single's cover sleeve. The musicians Chester Kamen (Nick Kamen's brother) and Guy Pratt also appear in the video. Also featured is Christine Keeler, whose earlier involvement with a British government minister triggered the Profumo affair, which discredited elements of the Conservative government of Harold Macmillan, in 1963. This is in keeping with the song's subject matter.

Track listings and versions

UK 7" single
 "Kiss and Tell" - 3:59
 "Zamba" - 3:00

US 7" single
 "Kiss and Tell (Edit)" - 4:02
 "Zamba" - 3:00

US 12" single
 "Kiss and Tell (Extended Mix)" - 7:06
 "Kiss and Tell (Dub Mix)" - 5:37
 "Kiss and Tell (Edit Mix)" - 4:02
 "Zamba" - 3:00

UK 12" single
 "Kiss and Tell (Dance Mix)" - 7:02
 "Kiss and Tell (Dub Mix)" - 5:37
 "Zamba" - 3:00

US 12" single and CD single
 "Kiss and Tell (Edit Mix)" - 4:02
 "Kiss and Tell (LP Version)" - 4:57

UK CD single
 "Kiss and Tell" (7" Version) - 3:59
 "Kiss and Tell (Dub Mix)" - 5:37
 "Zamba" - 3:00
 "Kiss and Tell (Dance Mix)" - 7:02

Chart performance

Weekly Charts

Year-end Charts

Notes
 The other versions of the song were edited by the Latin Rascals and mixed by Alan Meyerson.

References

External links
 

1988 singles
Bryan Ferry songs
Songs written by Bryan Ferry
Sophisti-pop songs
British soft rock songs
1987 songs
Virgin Records singles
Reprise Records singles
Songs about the media
Songs about kissing